Ben Pinkelman (born June 13, 1994) is an American rugby union former player and current coach. As a player, he represented the United States in rugby sevens and the traditional fifteens version of the game. By the age of 25 Pinkelman competed in the highest profile tournaments in rugby sevens and rugby fifteens — the 2016 Olympics in Rio and the 2019 Rugby World Cup in Japan. He debuted for the United States sevens team at the 2016 Wellington 7's. He last played in 2021, and retired due to back injury.

Rugby career

Youth rugby
Pinkelman began playing rugby while he attended Cherry Creek High School in Denver, Colorado. Pinkelman was named Youth Rugby Player of the Year by USA Rugby in 2014. He represented the United States at the 2014 IRB Junior World Rugby Trophy in Hong Kong. He attended Colorado State University, where he studied Criminal justice, and played for the Colorado State Rams and the Denver Barbarians RFC. He was named as Division 1-A Rugby Player of the Week twice while attending CSU.

U.S. national sevens team
Pinkelman debuted for the United States sevens team at the 2016 Wellington 7's, and quickly cemented himself in the team with his tireless work rate and expert work at the breakdown. Pinkelman was the youngest player selected for the U.S. Olympic men’s rugby team at the 2016 Summer Olympics in Brazil, and started all five matches for the Eagles. 

Pinkelman's strong performance at the 2017 Hong Kong Sevens, especially in defense and at the breakdown, earned him his first Dream Team honors (the seven best players at a World Series event are named to the Dream Team) . At only 23, Pinkelman captained the USA 7s side at the 2018 USA Sevens, in Las Vegas, where he led the U.S. to its first World Series tournament win on home soil. Ben also earned his second Dream Team honors from his performance in the USA's tournament win.

In 2019, Pinkelman started the year off strong securing Dream Team honors in the Hamilton, New Zealand leg of the 2018/2019 World Series by securing inclusion in his third Dream Team. Pinkelman's strong work again earned him Dream Team honors in Las Vegas, and led the Eagles to their second consecutive tournament win at home.  Pinkelman's exceptional performance throughout the 2018/2019 season led the USA to a 2nd place finish for the overall series, their highest finish on the World Series ever, and garnered Pinkelman a 2018/2019 Season Dream Team selection confirming his status as one of the best rugby players in the world. Pinkelman's Sevens World Series stats are here and more about his 2018/2019 season is here.

Pinkelman sat out the first two tournaments of the 2018–20 Series as part of his recovery from the 2019 Rugby World Cup. He made an impact upon his return to the third and fourth legs of the Series in New Zealand and Australia, earning selection to the Dream Team for the 2020 Australia Sevens.

U.S. national fifteens team
Pinkelman's strong performance on the World Rugby Sevens Series led Gary Gold, the Head Coach of the USA Men's 15s Eagles, to request Pinkelman to join the U.S. national fifteens team as a loose forward in the team’s preparation for the 2019 Rugby World Cup in Japan. Pinkelman made his debut for the national fifteens team on August 2 in a win against Samoa at the 2019 World Rugby Pacific Nations Cup.

Pinkelman's performance in the Pacific Nations Cup earned him selection to the 2019  USA's Rugby World Cup side. He was selected for the World Cup squad despite the fact that he did not play the fifteens version of rugby union for three years prior to his selection to the team in the lead up to the World Cup. At the World Cup, he was not named to the match day squad for the opening match, but he did play in all three of the U.S. team’s remaining matches as a second half substitute.

References

External links 
 Ben Pinkelman at USA Rugby
 

1994 births
Living people
United States international rugby union players
American rugby union players
Male rugby sevens players
United States international rugby sevens players
Olympic rugby sevens players of the United States
Rugby sevens players at the 2016 Summer Olympics
Sportspeople from Omaha, Nebraska